Émile Garçon (26 September 1851 - 12 July 1922) was a French jurist. He served as a Law Professor at the University of Paris.

Works

References

1851 births
1922 deaths
People from Poitiers
Academic staff of the University of Paris
French jurists
19th-century jurists
20th-century jurists